The Greenbelt Arts Center is a theater located in the Roosevelt Center within the Greenbelt Historic District of Greenbelt, Maryland. It is normally configured as a three-quarter thrust, and seats approximately 90 people.  The theater shows regular plays and musicals, and hosts special events during the year; including free Labor Day plays, and a yearly winter youth musical.  It also hosts music concerts, dance and music companies, and displays art.

The theater company of the Arts Center started in 1980, but then performed at the now-closed Utopia Theatre.

Past shows
Past shows include:
Children of Eden
Daughters
Hamlet
Witness for the Prosecution

References

External links
Greenbelt Arts Center

Arts centers in Maryland
Performing arts centers in Maryland
Greenbelt, Maryland
Buildings and structures in Prince George's County, Maryland
Tourist attractions in Prince George's County, Maryland